The Koka Booth Amphitheatre is a performing arts amphitheatre in Cary, North Carolina, USA. It is located in Regency Park, which is owned and operated by the Town of Cary. The venue is managed by SMG, formally known as Spectacor Management Group. The venue was known as The Amphitheatre at Regency Park before the town's decision to name it after the former Cary mayor Koka Booth. It was constructed in 2000 on the north bank of the park's Symphony Lake.

The Booth Amphitheatre is located on Regency Parkway in southern Cary, which can be accessed by US Route 1/US 64 via the Tryon Road exit. The venue predominantly serves the Triangle area. The amphitheater, as well as adjacent Regency Park, has played host to the annual Cary 5K/10K since 2005.

Entertainment
The Booth Amphitheatre has hosted many festivals and a number of concerts by the North Carolina Symphony and numerous other performers.

See also
List of contemporary amphitheatres

References

External links

Town of Cary - information on Regency Park
Koka Booth Amphitheatre Visitor Reviews

Amphitheaters in North Carolina
Buildings and structures in Cary, North Carolina
Music venues in North Carolina
Tourist attractions in Wake County, North Carolina